Albion: An Anthology is a 2009 compilation album by the English folk musician and composer Chris Wood and released on the Navigator Records label. The album features selections from many of Wood's solo contributions, each track remastered and personally chosen by Wood himself.

CD Track Listing

Personnel
Chris Wood – composition, author, arrangement
Andy Cutting – arrangement
Karen Tweed – arrangement
Ian Carr – arrangement
Hugo Morris – photography 

2009 albums
Chris Wood (folk musician) albums